The 2020–21 season was FC St. Gallen's 142nd season in existence and the club's ninth consecutive season in the top flight of Swiss football. In addition to the domestic league, St. Gallen participated in this season's editions of the Swiss Cup. The season covered the period from August 2020 to 30 June 2021.

Players

First-team squad

Out on loan

Pre-season and friendlies

Competitions

Overview

Swiss Super League

League table

Results summary

Results by round

Matches

Swiss Cup

UEFA Europa League

References

External links

FC St. Gallen seasons
St. Gallen